Sandagsürengiin Erdenebat (born 5 October 1971) is a Mongolian boxer. He competed in the men's featherweight event at the 1992 Summer Olympics.

References

1971 births
Living people
Mongolian male boxers
Olympic boxers of Mongolia
Boxers at the 1992 Summer Olympics
Place of birth missing (living people)
Boxers at the 1990 Asian Games
Asian Games bronze medalists for Mongolia
Asian Games medalists in boxing
Medalists at the 1990 Asian Games
Featherweight boxers
20th-century Mongolian people
21st-century Mongolian people